Robert Harper (born 2 May 1948) is a South African cricketer. He played in one List A and eight first-class matches for Border from 1968/69 to 1976/77.

See also
 List of Border representative cricketers

References

External links
 

1948 births
Living people
South African cricketers
Border cricketers
Cricketers from East London, Eastern Cape